Shirmemet Ali (born 1 July 1997) is a Chinese footballer who currently plays for Chinese Super League side Henan Jianye.

Club career
Shirmemet started his professional career in 2017 when he was promoted to Portuguese club Gondomar's first team squad. He returned to Chinese Super League side Henan Jianye on 27 February 2018. On 2 March 2018, Shirmemet made his debut for the club in a 4–0 home defeat against Tianjin Quanjian, coming on as a substitute for Gu Cao in the 89th minute.

Career statistics
.

References

External links
 

1997 births
Living people
Uyghur people
People from Hotan
Chinese footballers
Uyghur sportspeople
Chinese people of Uyghur descent
Footballers from Xinjiang
Association football midfielders
Gondomar S.C. players
Henan Songshan Longmen F.C. players
Chinese Super League players
Chinese expatriate footballers
Expatriate footballers in Portugal
Chinese expatriate sportspeople in Portugal